The Trent Aegir, also known as the Eagre, is a tidal bore on the River Trent in England.  At certain times of the year, the lower tidal reaches of the Trent experience a moderately large bore (up to five feet (1.5m) high).  It is said to take its name from Ægir, a personification of the sea in Norse mythology, although this is disputed. A more likely derivation is from Old English ēagor (“flood, stream, water”).

The Aegir occurs when a high spring tide meets the downstream flow of the river. The funnel shape of the river mouth exaggerates this effect, causing a large wave to travel upstream as far as Gainsborough, Lincolnshire, and sometimes beyond. The Aegir cannot travel much beyond Gainsborough as the shape of the river reduces the Aegir to little more than a ripple, and weirs north of Newark-on-Trent, Nottinghamshire stop its path completely.

The Aegir can be seen at Gainsborough, Morton, East Stockwith, West Stockwith and Owston Ferry. The Environment Agency used to publish predictions for the occurrence of the bore, but now no longer provide these.
The United Kingdom Hydrographic Office (UKHO) provides a lot of useful tidal prediction information. The UKHO have a free tidal prediction service which provides tidal times for the forthcoming week.
In the years 2019 to 2021
A private prediction of the Aegir is regularly updated on an informational site about the neighboring community of Crowle, Lincolnshire.

It is alleged that King Cnut performed his purposely unsuccessful attempt to turn the tide back in the River Trent at Gainsborough. If this is the case, it is highly probable that Cnut was attempting to turn the Aegir tide.

The Aegir features in George Eliot's The Mill on the Floss (1860). "Above all, the great Floss, along which they wandered with a sense of travel, to see the rushing spring-tide, the awful Eagre, come up like a hungry monster." (Chapter 5)

References

External links 
"Aegir", BBC Lincolnshire
Environment Agency website
Trent Aegir 2022
Trent Aegir Videos - Various locations 19 May 2019

Tidal bores
Aegir
Tourist attractions in Lincolnshire